Maddam Sir – Kuch Baat Hai Kyunki Jazbaat Hai is an Indian comedy cop television show. The series aired from 24 February 2020 to 18 February 2023 on Sony SAB and digitally streamed on SonyLIV. The characters and the cases add to the fun and humour of the show. The common challenge for all these women is to bring sensitivity to their policing while dealing with cases that come to this police station.

Episode list

References 

Indian television series